Melville Charles James (13 May 1877 – 4 April 1957) was an Australian Anglican bishop. Ordained in 1902, he was vicar of St Peter's Ballarat and then the Archdeacon of Maryborough, then Ballarat, before his ordination to the episcopate.

References

1877 births
Anglican archdeacons in Australia
Anglican bishops of St Arnaud
20th-century Anglican bishops in Australia
1957 deaths